Fendalton is a suburb of Christchurch, in the South Island of New Zealand.

History
Fendalton was originally known as Fendall Town, named after the original settler of the land, Walpole Chesshyre Fendall (1830–1913). Fendall emigrated from Yorkshire in 1850 and took up land north of the Waimairi Stream. The name Fendall Town was soon applied to the area northwest of Hagley Park, extending as far as the modern location of Christchurch International Airport and including portions of Burnside, Bryndwr, and Harewood, among others. Early spelling also included Fendall's Town and Fendaltown, but by the 1880s Fendalton had become the most common form.
Fendalton was the site for many early buildings in the settlement of Christchurch, including an early flour mill along what is now Fendalton Road. This flour mill was constructed by Daniel Inwood, who came to New Zealand aboard the Sir George Seymour in 1850, and used machinery which Inwood brought with him from England.

The suburb is also home to multiple significant historical buildings, especially as examples of various styles of homestead. These include St Barnabas Church, Daresbury, and Los Angeles, one of the first examples of a California bungalow to be built in New Zealand.

A history of the suburb can be found in "Fendall's Legacy: A history of Fendalton and north-west Christchurch" by Frieda Looser.

Demographics

Fendalton had a population of 4,515 at the 2018 New Zealand census, a decrease of 63 people (-1.4%) since the 2013 census, and a decrease of 222 people (-4.7%) since the 2006 census. There were 1,656 households. There were 2,202 males and 2,313 females, giving a sex ratio of 0.95 males per female, with 678 people (15.0%) aged under 15 years, 993 (22.0%) aged 15 to 29, 1,866 (41.3%) aged 30 to 64, and 975 (21.6%) aged 65 or older.

Ethnicities were 84.2% European/Pākehā, 3.9% Māori, 1.2% Pacific peoples, 14.0% Asian, and 1.7% other ethnicities (totals add to more than 100% since people could identify with multiple ethnicities).

The proportion of people born overseas was 27.4%, compared with 27.1% nationally.

Although some people objected to giving their religion, 46.4% had no religion, 44.9% were Christian, 1.1% were Hindu, 0.7% were Muslim, 0.5% were Buddhist and 2.2% had other religions.

Of those at least 15 years old, 1,539 (40.1%) people had a bachelor or higher degree, and 297 (7.7%) people had no formal qualifications. The employment status of those at least 15 was that 1,626 (42.4%) people were employed full-time, 687 (17.9%) were part-time, and 105 (2.7%) were unemployed.

Location and services

Fendalton is situated to the west of the city centre, close to the University of Canterbury at Ilam and the major retail area of Riccarton. It is also close to the main route from the central city to the Christchurch International Airport to the northwest.

Fendalton has a reputation as one of the country's more well-to-do and refined suburbs, and is one of the older residential districts of the city.

Education
One high school lies directly within the suburb - Christchurch Boys' High School. The school opened in 1881, and moved to its present site in 1926. 

While Christchurch Girls' High School catchment zone encompasses much of Fendalton, the school itself lies within the suburb of Riccarton.  

The local state intermediate school is Cobham Intermediate School.  

The main primary school in Fendalton is Fendalton Open Air School, originally called Clyde Road Primary School. It opened in 1875.

References

Suburbs of Christchurch